The Inquiry was a study group established in September 1917 by Woodrow Wilson to prepare materials for the peace negotiations following World War I.  The group, composed of around 150 academics, was directed by the presidential adviser Edward House and supervised directly by the philosopher Sidney Mezes. The Heads of Research were Walter Lippmann and his successor Isaiah Bowman. The group first worked out of the New York Public Library but later worked from the offices of the American Geographical Society of New York once Bowman had joined the group.

Mezes's senior colleagues were the geographer Isaiah Bowman, the historian and librarian Archibald Cary Coolidge, the historian James Shotwell, and the lawyer David Hunter Miller. Progressive confidants who were consulted on staffing but did not contribute directly to the administration or reports of the group included James Truslow Adams, Louis Brandeis, Abbott Lawrence Lowell, and Walter Weyl.

Twenty-one members of The Inquiry, later integrated into the larger American Commission to Negotiate Peace, traveled to the Paris Peace Conference in January 1919 and accompanied Wilson aboard USS George Washington to France.

Also included in the group were such academics as Paul Monroe, a professor of history at Columbia University and a key member of the Research Division who drew on his experience in the Philippines to assess the educational needs of developing areas such as Albania, Turkey, and Central Africa, and Frank A. Golder, a history professor from Washington State University, who specialized in the diplomatic history of Russia and wrote papers on Ukraine, Lithuania, Poland, and Russia.

Recommendations
The Inquiry provided various recommendations for the countries which it surveyed. Specifically, the recommendations discussed the ideal borders for various countries as well as various other conditions that were felt necessary to achieve a lasting peace free of tensions.

France, Belgium, Luxembourg, and Denmark
The Inquiry recommended Alsace–Lorraine to be returned to France, the parts of the Saarland, which France had controlled before 1815, to be returned to it, and the Rhineland to be demilitarized. In regards to Belgium, it was recommended for Belgium's neutral status to be abolished and for Belgium to be allowed to annex some territory in the Maastricht and Malmedy regions for strategic (in the case of Maastricht) and ethnic (in the case of Malmedy) reasons. As for Luxembourg, it was recommended for it to be annexed to Belgium or to have its independence restored. Meanwhile, there should be a plebiscite in northern Schleswig, and the area should be transferred from Germany to Denmark if the region's people preferred.

Russia, Poland, and the former Russian Empire
The Inquiry suggested that if it was possible for Russia to become a genuine federal and democratic state, the Baltic states (with the possible exception of Lithuania) and Ukraine should be encouraged to reunify with Russia because of the belief that it would best serve the economic interests of everyone involved. Meanwhile, if the Bolsheviks maintained their control of Russia, the Inquiry suggested for the independence of the Baltic states and Ukraine to be recognized if a referendum on reunion with Russia was held in those territories at some future better time. As for the borders of Ukraine, Latvia, and Estonia, the borders that were proposed for them were very similar to the borders that these countries ended up with after 1991. Indeed, the Inquiry even suggested that Crimea should be given to Ukraine.

Regarding Finland, the Inquiry expressed its support for its independence and also unsuccessfully expressed a desire to see Åland transferred from Finland to Sweden. It was recommended for an independent Poland to be created out of all indisputably-Polish areas, Poland and Lithuania to unite if possible, and Poland to "be given secure and unhampered access to the Baltic [Sea]" by the creation of a Polish Corridor. While acknowledging that it would be unfortunate to separate East Prussia, with its 1,600,000 Germans, from the rest of Germany, the Inquiry considered that to be the lesser evil than denying Poland,  nation of 20,000,000 people, access to the sea. In addition, the Inquiry expressed confidence that Germany could easily be assured railroad transit across the Polish Corridor. As for Poland's eastern borders, the Inquiry kept the door option to a Polish annexation of eastern Galicia and Belarusian-majority territories to its north.

In the Caucasus, the Inquiry suggested giving independence to Armenia in the borders of Wilsonian Armenia and provisional independence to both Georgia and Azerbaijan. In addition, the idea of a future union of Armenia, Georgia, and Azerbaijan (in the form of a Transcaucasian Federation) was discussed and looked at favorably by the Inquiry.

Czechoslovakia, Romania, Yugoslavia, and Italy
It was suggested for Czechoslovakia to be created out of the Czech-majority and Slovak-majority areas of the former Austria-Hungary. In addition, it was suggested for Czechoslovakia to include both the Sudetenland and Subcarpathian Ruthenia and more than 500,000 Hungarians (Magyars) south of Slovakia.

As for Romania, the Inquiry advised to allow it to annex all of Bessarabia, the Romanian-majority part of Bukovina, all of Transylvania, the Romanian-majority areas in Hungary proper, and about two thirds of the Banat. In addition, the Inquiry suggested having Romania cede Southern Dobruja to Bulgaria, which ultimately occurred in 1940. Meanwhile, it was suggested for an "independent federated Yugo-Slav state" to be created out of Serbia; Montenegro; and the Serbian, Croatian, and Slovenian territories of the former Austria-Hungary.

The Inquiry acknowledged that the Brenner Pass, which had been promised to Italy in the 1915 Treaty of London, would give Italy the best strategic frontier, but it recommended a line somewhat to the south of it to reduce the number of ethnic Germans who would be put inside of Italy and still give Italy a more defensible border in the north than it had had before World War I. In addition, it was suggested for Italy to be allowed to annex Istria, with its large number of ethnic Italians, but not Italian-majority Fiume because of its importance to Yugoslavia. In addition, the Inquiry advised that Italy should end its occupation of Rhodes and the Dodecanese Islands and give the islands to Greece, in accordance with the wishes of their inhabitants, something that was done but only in 1947, after the end of World War II. Also, the Inquiry recommended for Italian Libya to "be given a hinterland adequate for access to the Sudan and its trade."

German Austria and Hungary
It was recommended for German Austria, which was later renamed the Republic of Austria, to be established as an independent state and be given an outlet for trade at Trieste, Fiume, or both cities. Meanwhile, it was suggested for Hungary to be given independence with borders very similar to the ones that it ultimately ended up getting by the Treaty of Trianon and for it to be given also an outlet for trade at either Trieste or Fiume as well as "rights of unrestricted commerce on the lower Danube." As for the German-majority Burgenland, the Inquiry advised to keep it inside of Hungary, at least until it became clear that the people there indeed desired union with Austria, to avoid "disturb[ing] long-established institutions."

Albania, Constantinople, the Straits, and the Middle East
No specific recommendations were given for Albania because of the extremely complex nature of the situation there.

As for Constantinople, it was suggested for an internationalized state to be created there and for the Bosporus, Sea of Marmara, and the Dardanelles to be permanently open to ships and commercial vessels of all countries with international guarantees to uphold that. Meanwhile, in regards to Anatolia, it was advised for an independent Turkish Anatolian state to be created under a League of Nations mandate, with the Great Power in charge of the mandate being determined later.

Also, the Inquiry suggested for independent Mesopotamian and Syrian states to be created under a League of Nations mandate, with the decision as to the great powers in charge of the mandates being reserved for later. The proposed Syrian state would consist of territories that are now part of Lebanon, northern Jordan, and western Syria. Meanwhile, the proposed Mesopotamian state would consist of territories that are now part of Iraq and northeastern Syria. In addition, it was advised to keep open the option of the creation of an Arab confederation that would include Mesopotamia and Syria.

As for Palestine, it was advised for an independent state under a British mandate for Palestine to be created. Jews would be invited to return to Palestine and settle there if the protection of the personal, religious, and property rights of the non-Jewish population are assured, and the state's holy sites would be under the protection of the League of Nations. The League of Nations was to recognize Palestine as a Jewish state as soon as it was in fact.

In regards to Arabia, it was suggested for the King of Hejaz not to be given assistance to impose his rule over unwilling Arab tribes.

Legacy
Some of the members later established the Council on Foreign Relations, which is independent of the government.

The Inquiry's papers are currently stored at the National Archives, though some of their papers (in many cases, duplicates) are stored at the Yale Archives.

References

Organizations established in 1917